In Islam, iddah or iddat ("period of waiting") is the period a woman must observe after the death of her husband or after a divorce, during which she may not marry another man. One of its main purposes is to remove any doubt as to the paternity of a child born after the divorce or death of the prior husband.

The length of ‘iddah varies according to a number of circumstances. Generally, the ‘iddah of a divorced woman is three lunar months (i.e. about 89 days), but if the marriage was not consummated there is no ‘iddah. For a woman whose husband has died, the ‘iddah is four lunar months and ten days (i.e. about 128 days) after the death of her husband, whether or not the marriage was consummated.  If a woman is pregnant when she is widowed or divorced, the ‘iddah lasts until she gives birth.

Islamic scholars consider this directive to be a balance between mourning of husband's death and protecting the widow from criticism that she might be subjected to from remarrying too quickly after her husband’s death. This is also to ascertain whether a woman is pregnant or not, since four and a half months is half the length of a normal pregnancy.

Iddah for widows

Scriptural basis
The directive within the Quran (Al-Baqarah 2:234-235), regarding the waiting period for a widow, is:

Main directives
The following is a summary of the main directives (for widows) contained in these verses:

 The waiting period (Iddah) of a widow is four months and ten days;
 During this period, the woman is not to marry another man;
 During this period, a person may declare his intentions of marrying the widow — in a socially acceptable manner — or he may keep such intentions to himself, yet he should not make a secret commitment of marriage with the widow; and
 The time and place of the marriage-contract should be finalized and committed to only after the period of four months and ten days has expired.
These are the basic Sharia directives regarding the waiting period for a widow.  It is also clear from another directive of the Quran that during this waiting period, the woman should not be turned out of her house.

Iddah for divorced women

Scriptural basis
The directive within the Quran (Al-Baqarah 2:228), regarding the waiting period for a divorcee, is:

In surah Al-Ahzab it is stated:

In the Quran surah At-Talaq Verse 65:4, it is stated:

The directive within the Quran Surat At-Talaq 65:4, regarding the waiting period for "those who have no courses"  (i.e. they are still young), is:

And those of your women as have passed the age of monthly courses, for them the ‘Iddah (prescribed period), if you have doubts (about their periods), is three months, and for those who have no courses (i.e. they are still immature) their ‘Iddah (prescribed period) is three months likewise, except in case of death.
	
The Mohsin Khan translation also clarifies that this refers to those who have not yet menstruated, as they are "still immature".

Main directives
The following is a summary of the main directives (for divorces) contained in these verses:
The waiting period for a menstruating woman is, three monthly periods
The waiting period for a non-menstruating women is, three lunar months
The waiting period of a woman who has no monthly courses (due to young age) is three months
The husband is more entitled to take her back during this period provided that he wants reconciliation. However this is the case only in case of first or second divorce. 
If a Muslim man marries a Muslim woman then divorces her before touching her then there is no iddah.

Commentaries

Imam Suyuti's commentary, Tafsir al-Jalalayn: And as for those of your women who read allā’ī or allā’i in both instances no longer expect to menstruate if you have any doubts about their waiting period their prescribed waiting period shall be three months and also for those who have not yet menstruated because of their young age their period shall also be three months — both cases apply to other than those whose spouses have died; for these latter their period is prescribed in the verse they shall wait by themselves for four months and ten days.

Tafsir ibn Kathir, says of this verse, Her Iddah is three months instead of the three monthly cycles for those who menstruate, which is based upon the Ayah in (Surat) Al-Baqarah. (see 2:228) The same for the young, who have not reached the years of menstruation. Their `Iddah is three months like those in menopause. The Tafsir al Jalalyn co-authored by the scholar Imam Suyuti says of this verseAnd [as for] those of your women who (read allā’ī or allā’i in both instances) no longer expect to menstruate, if you have any doubts, about their waiting period, their prescribed [waiting] period shall be three months, and [also for] those who have not yet menstruated, because of their young age, their period shall [also] be three months

Iddah for pregnant women

Scriptural basis

Main directive
Divorced women and widows who are pregnant cannot remarry until delivery. Remarriage cannot take place until a period of waiting removes all doubt about any existing pregnancy.

See also
 Divorce in Islam
 Menstruation in Islam
 Niddah separation of menstruating women in Judaism

References

Marriage in Islam
Divorce in Islam
Islamic terminology